The 1983 Giro di Lombardia was the 77th edition of the Giro di Lombardia cycle race and was held on 15 October 1983. The race started in Brescia and finished in Como. The race was won by Sean Kelly of the Sem–France Loire team.

General classification

References

1983
Giro di Lombardia
Giro di Lombardia
Giro di Lombardia